Wine of Youth is a 1924 American silent comedy drama film directed by King Vidor, and released by Metro-Goldwyn-Mayer, shortly after the merger which created MGM in April 1924. Vidor did not consider it important enough to mention in his autobiography, although it did advance the careers of three young stars-to-be: Ben Lyon, Eleanor Boardman, and William Haines.

An early “flapper” romance of the Roaring Twenties, Vidor tested the limits of presenting unconventional social behavior among American youth in the Jazz Age  which ends with a paean to parental authority.

Plot
Mary (Eleanor Boardman) is a girl wooed by two suitors but made afraid of marriage by the quarreling of her parents. Eventually she accepts Lynn, the more refined and poised of the two suitors.

Cast

Production
Vidor's arrival at the newly amalgamated Metro-Goldwyn-Mayer would mark the beginning of a 20-year association with the studio. Wine of Youth is his first film appear under M-G-M.

Theme
Wine of Youth is the first of four films that preceded Vidor's groundbreaking war epic The Big Parade (1925). In substance these four “Jazz Age flaming youth pictures” of which three survive bear little resemblance to work to emerge in the late 1920s.

Vidor opens the film by contrasting the courtship rituals that characterized the mothers and grandmothers of the female “flappers” in the post-WWI period. The young women of the earlier Victorian Era swoon while reclining in their parent's parlor with their beaux, declaring “there's never been so great a love as ours.” The liberated flappers reject these conventions and  organize a faux honeymoon with their boyfriends in the forest. Here they drink alcohol, smoke cigarettes and cavort sexually, images very appealing to urban youth of that era. (Vidor described the movie as an “exploitation piece”).

Having defied conventionality and flirted with her virginity, the protagonist, Mary, discovers a new and genuine desire for her future husband that returns her to the fold: “there's never been so great a love as ours.” Ostensibly an effort to present the virtues of a trial marriage - to discover “how a man is in every day life before you give him your all” - Vidor contended that “there were so many restrictions and inhibitions that it really took the guts out of the idea.”

Preservation
The film is preserved at George Eastman House, Rochester New York. In February 2020, the film was shown at the 70th Berlin International Film Festival, as part of a retrospective dedicated to King Vidor's career.

Footnotes

References
Baxter, John. 1976. King Vidor. Simon & Schuster, Inc. Monarch Film Studies. LOC Card Number 75-23544.
Durgnat, Raymond and Simmon, Scott. 1988. King Vidor, American. University of California Press, Berkeley. 
Eames, John Douglas (1988). The MGM Story: the Complete History of Fifty Roaring Years. Crown Publishers.

External links

1924 films
1924 comedy-drama films
1920s English-language films
American silent feature films
American black-and-white films
Films directed by King Vidor
Films produced by Louis B. Mayer
Metro-Goldwyn-Mayer films
Flappers
1920s American films
Silent American comedy-drama films